The 1998 Giro d'Italia was the 81st edition of the Giro. It began on 16 May with a brief  prologue that navigated through the streets of the French city Nice. The race came to a close on 7 June with a mass-start stage that ended in the Italian city of Milan. Eighteen teams entered the race that was won by the Italian Marco Pantani of the  team. Second and third were the Russian rider Pavel Tonkov and Italian Giuseppe Guerini.

In the race's other classifications, overall winner Marco Pantani also won the mountains classification, Mariano Piccoli of the Brescialat-Liquigas team won the points classification, and  rider Gian Matteo Fagnini won the intergiro classification.  finished as the winners of the Trofeo Fast Team classification, ranking each of the eighteen teams contesting the race by lowest cumulative time.

Teams

A total of 18 teams were invited to participate in the 1998 Giro d'Italia. Each team sent a squad of nine riders, so the Giro began with a peloton of 162 cyclists. The presentation of the teams – where each team's roster and manager were introduced in front the media and local dignitaries – took place on the Apollon Concert Hall. Out of the 162 riders that started this edition of the Giro d'Italia, a total of 94 riders made it to the finish in Milan.

The 18 teams that took part in the race were:

Pre-race favourites
Several riders were considered to be potential contenders for the victory before the race began. These included the winners of the previous two editions, Ivan Gotti and Pavel Tonkov. Alex Zülle, who had won the Vuelta a España in both 1996 and 1997, was also considered a strong challenger. Marco Pantani had come back to the Giro the previous year from injury, only to retire after a crash which occurred when a cat ran into the peloton. He went on to win two stages of the 1997 Tour de France and was therefore also a challenger at the 1998 Giro.

Route and stages

The route for the 1998 Giro d'Italia was unveiled by race director Carmine Castellano on 22 November 1997 in Milan. It contained three time trial events, all of which were individual. There were eleven stages containing high mountains, of which four had summit finishes: stage 11, to San Marino; stage 14, to Piancavallo; stage 18, to Passo di Pampeago; and stage 19, to Plan di Montecampione. The organizers chose to include no rest days. When compared to the previous year's race, the race was  shorter, contained the one less rest day, as well as one more individual time trial. After a five-year absence, RAI broadcast the event, replacing Reti Televisive Italiane (RTI) who had shown the race since 1993.

There were a total of seven stages that started outside Italy. The 1998 Giro d'Italia began with a prologue around the French city of Nice, which also served as the start for the race's first stage. Stage 11 finished in San Marino and the twelfth stage began there as well. The Giro's twentieth stage ended in Mendrisio. Stage 21 began in Mendrisio ended in Lugano, which also served as the start for stage 22.

Race overview
The race started in the French city of Nice with a prologue time trial, which was won by Zülle, who established an early lead over his general classification rivals. Pantani was aggressive from the early stages on, including an attack at the Capo Berta climb during stage 2. However, the first road stages saw race victories by sprinters, before Zülle took another victory on stage 7, at the ski resort of Laceno.

On stage 14 to Piancavallo, Pantani was victorious, but only took out 13 seconds on Zülle and Tonkov. On the next day, a long time trial in Trieste, Zülle caught Pantani on the road and finished 3:26 minutes faster, gaining a stronger grip on the race leader's jersey.

Pantani however still remained convinced that he could win the race, considering that three stages in high mountains lay ahead, a terrain that favoured him. On stage 17 into Sëlva, Pantani attacked with Giuseppe Guerini on the climb of the Marmolada. Zülle cracked and lost four minutes, while Pantani, who gave the stage win to Guerini, took the leader's pink jersey. Tonkov hit back by winning the following stage at Alpe di Pampeago and now was just 27 seconds behind Pantani. Stage 19 to Montecampione saw Pantani and Tonkov engage in a fight for the victory on the final climb, while Zülle lost more than thirty minutes on both riders. Pantani was eventually able to leave Tonkov behind, winning the stage and exceeding his advantage to 1:27 minutes. The race had to be decided during the final time trial from Mendrisio to Lugano. Originally considered the weaker time trialist, Pantani managed to pull out another five seconds on Tonkov and sealed his victory in the Giro d'Italia. Serhiy Honchar won the stage, thirty seconds ahead of Pantani in third. Two months later, he also won the Tour de France, becoming only the seventh rider to win both races in the same year.

Classification leadership

Four different jerseys were worn during the 1998 Giro d'Italia. The leader of the general classification – calculated by adding the stage finish times of each rider, and allowing time bonuses for the first three finishers on mass-start stages – wore a pink jersey. This classification is the most important of the race, and its winner is considered as the winner of the Giro.

For the points classification, which awarded a purple (or cyclamen) jersey to its leader, cyclists were given points for finishing a stage in the top 15; additional points could also be won in intermediate sprints. The green jersey was awarded to the mountains classification leader. In this ranking, points were won by reaching the summit of a climb ahead of other cyclists. Each climb was ranked as either first, second or third category, with more points available for higher category climbs. The Cima Coppi, the race's highest point of elevation, awarded more points than the other first category climbs. The Cima Coppi for this Giro was the Passo Sella and was first climbed by the Italian Marco Pantani. The intergiro classification was marked by a blue jersey. The calculation for the intergiro is similar to that of the general classification, in each stage there is a midway point that the riders pass through a point and where their time is stopped. As the race goes on, their times compiled and the person with the lowest time is the leader of the intergiro classification and wears the blue jersey. Although no jersey was awarded, there was also one classification for the teams, in which the stage finish times of the best three cyclists per team were added; the leading team was the one with the lowest total time.

The rows in the following table correspond to the jerseys awarded after that stage was run.

Final standings

General classification

Points classification

Mountains classification

Intergiro classification

Trofeo Fast Team classification

Trofeo Super Team classification

References

Citations

 
1998 in Italian sport
1998
1998 in road cycling
May 1998 sports events in Europe
June 1998 sports events in Europe